Michael John Regan (November 19, 1887 – May 22, 1961) was a Major League Baseball pitcher who played for the Cincinnati Reds from  to .

External links

1887 births
1961 deaths
Baseball players from New York (state)
Major League Baseball pitchers
Cincinnati Reds players
Wichita Witches players
Kansas City Blues (baseball) players
Seattle Rainiers players
People from Phoenix, New York
Burials at St. Agnes Cemetery